Tourism in Melbourne is a significant industry in the state of Victoria, Australia. The country's second most-populous city, Melbourne was visited by 2.7 million international overnight visitors and 9.3 million domestic overnight visitors during the year ending December 2017.

Often lauded as Australia's heart of culture, Melbourne's attractions include sporting events, art galleries, live music, festivals and fashion events that are popular with tourists and locals alike. Named the world's most liveable city from 2011 to 2017, Melbourne's culture and lifestyle have been increasingly promoted internationally, leading to average year-on-year growth of international visitors of 10% in the five years to 2017.

In its annual survey of readers, the Condé Nast Traveler magazine found that both Melbourne and Auckland were considered the world's friendliest cities in 2014. The magazine described the "wonderful sense of humour" of Melburnians, who live among public art and parks.

Tourist numbers

Popular sites
Melbourne's most popular tourist sites for fiscal year ending June 2018:

Other notable sites:
Chinatown- the longest continuous Chinese settlement in the Western World and third oldest Chinatown in the world, features numerous restaurants, museums and cultural attractions
Eureka Skydeck- the highest viewing platform in the southern hemisphere, located in Eureka Tower
Luna Park- an amusement park located on the foreshore of Port Phillip Bay in St Kilda, an inner suburb of Melbourne. It has been operating since 1912
Melbourne Aquarium- contains a variety of exhibits showcasing marine wildlife found in the Southern Ocean and the Antarctic
Melbourne Convention & Exhibition Centre- built along Southbank in the 1990s as an update for the Royal Exhibition Building, it regularly hosts special conventions and exhibitions
Melbourne Park- the home of the Australian Open tennis tournament, one of the four Grand Slams held every January
Old Melbourne Gaol- built in the 19th century, housed dangerous criminals alongside petty offenders, the homeless and the mentally ill. Australia's most infamous citizen, Ned Kelly, was hanged here and this is now a tourist site commemorating the life of those jailed
Shrine of Remembrance on St Kilda Road- one of Australia's largest war memorials and features annual observances of Anzac Day and Remembrance Day, as well as a tomb of the unknown soldier
State Library of Victoria- Australia's oldest library and one of the world's first free libraries, famed for its large Domed Reading Room and front lawn
Victorian Arts Centre- features a landmark spire, it hosts Opera Australia's Melbourne season, the Melbourne Symphony Orchestra, the Melbourne Theatre Company and the Australian Ballet Company

Restaurant & café districts

Restaurants 

Melbourne is known for its foodie culture and its abundance, variety and quality of restaurants. In part this is due to various waves of immigration and the multicultural fabric of the city. Major restaurant strips are located throughout the inner city and the inner suburbs, including:

Chinatown- featuring mainly Cantonese cuisine (and increasingly other Asian cuisines) and famous restaurants such as Flower Drum
Lygon Street- Melbourne's Little Italy in the inner-northern suburb of Carlton, offers a selection of mainly Italian-influenced food
 Brunswick Street- in inner-suburban Fitzroy home to a bohemian community of students, artists, and poets with several live music venues, eclectic stores, accompanied by restaurants and cafes serving numerous cuisines
 Chapel Street- south of the city is a popular destination for fashionable clothes shopping, eating and entertainment. The long street contains commercial areas providing goods and services for local residents. Chapel Street intersects with Toorak Road, itself offering entertainment, food and shops.
 Glenferrie Road- east of the city in the inner suburban Malvern has a wide mix of different cuisines including Indian, Malaysian, Thai and Japanese. The street intersects with High Street in Armadale which also has a mix of antique shops, cafes and restaurants
 Glen Huntly Road- south east of the city in inner suburban Elsternwick is a busy strip that offers a wide range of different restaurant cuisines including Chinese, Malaysian Indian, Thai, and some Middle Eastern cuisines
Victoria Street- known as Melbourne's Little Saigon featuring numerous Vietnamese restaurants (and increasingly Thai, Korean and Japanese)
 Nelson Place- a waterside street in Williamstown known for weekend breakfasts, brunches and lunches

Coffee Culture 

Melbourne is also known as a coffee-obsessed city, with the flat white an Australian-invented favourite (though the flat white is believed to have originated in Sydney). The city's coffee culture is largely a result of Italian immigration, but has evolved into a local passion over time. It is often claimed that Pellegrini's Espresso Bar, on Bourke Street, was the first cafe to use the espresso machine in Melbourne. The city centre features a ubiquitous cafe culture, with high concentrations of cafés around a few famous alleys, including:

 Block Arcade
 Degraves Street
 Hardware Lane

Many inner suburbs also feature streets famous for cafes, including:

 Collingwood's Smith Street
Fitzroy's Brunswick Street, Gertrude Street and Johnson Street
Richmond's Bridge Road and Victoria Street
South Yarra's Chapel Street and Greville Street
Southbank's Southgate
St Kilda's Carlisle Street and Acland Street

Bars, pubs and nightlife
Melbourne features Australia's most active nightlife scene with pubs, bars, and nightclubs spread throughout the city and inner suburbs.

The CBD contains a wide variety of venues, from Irish pubs and more traditional Australian hotels, through to wine bars, jazz venues on Bennetts Lane,  nightclubs and dance venues (where the Melbourne Shuffle was born). Venues are often located down Melbourne's famous network of laneways and alleys.

Well-known pub, bar and nightclub districts include:

 Brunswick Street and its surrounding area features an array of rock and grunge venues
 King Street, on the Western side of the CBD, traditionally a nightclub strip with some remaining, but many are now exotic dancing venues
 Chapel Street in Prahran features many bars and nightclubs
 St Kilda- houses several huge music venues including the famous Esplanade Hotel (known as 'the Espy'), the Prince of Wales, and the Palais Theatre

Melbourne also has a vibrant gay community, with gay and gay-friendly bars across the city. It is mostly concentrated on two gay villages – Commercial Rd, South Yarra and Smith St, Collingwood, but there are also gay bars and clubs in St Kilda, Fitzroy, Richmond and Yarraville.

Close to Melbourne
There are a variety of interesting things to see outside Melbourne proper but still within a day trip of Melbourne:
 The Yarra Valley region, producer of high-quality wine and with rainforest scenery nearby.
 The Mornington Peninsula, with its wineries, beaches and the Arthurs Seat lookout. 
 The Surf Coast near Geelong, with its surf beaches and views of the Great Ocean Road (Voted the world's best road trip in 2003).
 Ballarat, a small city once the centre of the gold rush and site of the Eureka Stockade.
 Bendigo.
 Phillip Island, home of the Australian Motorcycle Grand Prix, also has one of the few easily accessible colonies of little penguins.
 French Island in Western Port Bay
 Geelong,  down the Princes Hwy is the gateway to many of Australia's tourist destinations such as the Great Ocean Road, Twelve Apostles and Bells Beach. Geelong is famous for its world class waterfront on Corio Bay. One of the largest waterfront redevelopments ever undertaken in Australia, Waterfront Geelong includes Cunningham Pier featuring a Carousel Pavilion, and the art-deco bathing area at Eastern Beach.
 Gippsland region, home of the Gourmet Deli Tours, the Gippsland Lakes, Wilsons Promontory (with South Point, the most southerly point of the Australian mainland), and many picturesque towns such as Sale, Foster, Bairnsdale, Lakes Entrance, and Warragul – one of the richest dairy farming areas in Australia. The ghost town of Walhalla is filled with goldmining memorabilia.

Australian tourism 
Melbourne's domestic tourist spend per capita exceeded Sydney for the first time in 2008; however a spokesman for the NSW Tourism Minister stated that Melbourne earned less in terms of overall tourist revenue.

See also 

 Culture of Melbourne
 History of Melbourne
 List of museums in Melbourne
 Media in Melbourne
 Transport in Melbourne
 Tourism in Australia

References

External links

Visit Melbourne – official state guide to Melbourne.
Citysearch Melbourne – guide to eating out, bars, clubs, events & music.
City of Melbourne What's On
Melbourne – Tourism Australia
 – Destination Melbourne
 – Official Visitor Guide to Melbourne iPhone app